Creekside High School is a public high school serving grades nine through twelve. It is located in Fairburn, Georgia, United States. It is a part of the Fulton County School System.

The school opened in the fall of 1990 as a result of the merger of Campbell High School in Fairburn, and Palmetto High School in Palmetto.  The merger happened as a result of a consolidation plan to reduce the costs of the school system, comply with new state laws mandating minimum attendance numbers for government-funded schools, and upgrade the course offerings of all schools in the county.

Athletics
Creekside offers Baseball, Basketball, Cheerleading, Cross Country, Football, Golf, Soccer, Softball, Swimming, Tennis, Track & Field, Volleyball, and Wrestling.

In its first year of existence, Creekside won the 4 × 400 m relay, and Octavius Terry won the 300m IH at the GHSA Boys' State Track Meet. Octavius Terry was also named Most Outstanding Performer for the meet. In 1995, the varsity boys' basketball made a Final 4 appearance in the state playoffs. In 2001, the varsity football team made it to the Georgia Dome for a semi-finals appearance in the state playoffs. In 2000-2001, the girls' varsity basketball had an appearance in the state playoffs' Final 4. The 2002 varsity boys' basketball team played for the 4A State Championship title against local rival Westlake High School.  To open the 2002-2003 season, the varsity boys' basketball team was ranked #1 in the state.  In 2012-2013, the varsity boys basketball team made an appearance in the state playoffs, advancing all the way to the Elite Eight. In 2014, the Creekside football team suffered the loss of one of their defensive stars and used that to fuel an undefeated season which resulted in winning the Class AAAAA football State Title, defeating Tucker High School in dominating fashion. In 2017 the Seminole football team suffered their worst season, which resulted in an overall 0-10. The following 2018 year the Seminole football team returned in a crushing fashion ending their season 7-3 with their region being 7-1. This ultimately helped the Seminoles regain a region title which was last earned in 2014.

Marching band
Creekside's marching band is the S.O.S. Express and the dance team is the Golden Essence.

Notable alumni
 Eric Berry - NFL player, Kansas City Chiefs, safety
 Evan Berry - All-American college football player for the University of Tennessee
 Joshua Holsey - NFL player, Washington Redskins, cornerback
 Kevin Murphy - professional basketball player for the Cedevita Zagreb
 Nivea - singer
 Pastor Troy - rapper
 Octavius Terry - NCAA Champion hurdler, U.S. Olympic Trial Contestant
 Playboi Carti - rapper
 OG Maco - rapper

References

External links
 Creekside High School
 Creekside Athletics
 Fulton County School System

Public high schools in Georgia (U.S. state)
Schools in Fulton County, Georgia
Educational institutions established in 1990
1990 establishments in Georgia (U.S. state)